Miss World 1954, the 4th edition of the Miss World pageant, was held on 18 October 1954 at the Lyceum Ballroom in London, United Kingdom. 17 contestants competed for the crown. Denise Perrier of France crowned her successor Antigone Costanda of Egypt. During this time, Costanda was only presented with trophy.

Results

Contestants 

  - Nelly Elvire Dehem
  - Jeannette de Jonk
  - Grete Hoffenblad
  - Antigone Costanda
  - Yvonne de Bruyn
   - Claudine Bleuse
  - Frauke Walther
  - Patricia Butler
  - Efi Mela
  - Conny Harteveld
  - Connie Rodgers
  - Cristina Fantonni
  - Margareta Westling
  - Claudine Buller
  - Sibel Göksel
  - Karin Hultman

Notes

Debuts

Did not complete 
  - Seeta Indranie Mahabir

Returns 
Last competed in 1952:

Withdrawals

References

External links 
 

Miss World
1954 in London
1954 beauty pageants
Beauty pageants in the United Kingdom
October 1954 events in the United Kingdom